In physics, a dynamical system is said to be mixing if the phase space of the system becomes strongly intertwined, according to at least one of several mathematical definitions.  For example, a measure-preserving transformation T is said to be strong mixing if 

 

whenever A and B are any measurable sets and μ is the associated measure. Other definitions are possible, including weak mixing and topological mixing.

The mathematical definition of mixing is meant to capture the notion of physical mixing. A canonical example is the Cuba libre: suppose one is adding rum (the set A) to a glass of cola. After stirring the glass, the bottom half of the glass (the set B) will contain rum, and it will be in equal proportion as it is elsewhere in the glass. The mixing is uniform: no matter which region B one looks at, some of A will be in that region.  A far more detailed, but still informal description of mixing can be found in the article on mixing (mathematics).

Every mixing transformation is ergodic, but there are ergodic transformations which are not mixing.

Physical mixing 
The mixing of gases or liquids is a complex physical process, governed by  a convective diffusion equation that may involve non-Fickian diffusion as in spinodal decomposition.  The convective portion of the governing equation contains fluid motion terms that are governed by the Navier–Stokes equations. When fluid properties such as viscosity depend on composition, the governing equations may be coupled. There may also be temperature effects.  It is not clear that fluid mixing processes are mixing in the mathematical sense.

Small rigid objects (such as rocks) are sometimes mixed in a rotating drum or tumbler. The 1969 Selective Service draft lottery was carried out by mixing plastic capsules which contained a slip of paper (marked with a day of the year).

See also 
 Miscibility

References 
 V.I. Arnold and A. Avez. Ergodic Problems of Classical Mechanics. New York: W.A. Benjamin. 1968.
 J Lebowitz and O. Penrose, Modern ergodic theory. Physics Today, 26, 155-175, February 1973. 

Ergodic theory
Statistical mechanics